Tracy Freeman (born 5 January 1962), better known as Tracy Spencer, is a British Italo disco singer and actress, discovered by the Italian record producer and talent scout Claudio Cecchetto. Born in Halifax, West Yorkshire, she is best known for the song "Run to Me", which won the 1986 Festivalbar and was No. 1 on the Italian hit parade.

Discography

Album
 1987 - Tracy - ITA #14

Singles
 1986 - "Run to Me" - ITA #1
 1986 - "Love Is Like a Game" - ITA #9
 1987 - "Take Me Back" - ITA #12
 1988 - "Two to Tango Too" / "I Feel for You" - ITA #15

References

External links 

 

1962 births
20th-century Black British women singers
British Italo disco musicians
English expatriates in Italy
English people of Jamaican descent
English women pop singers
Living people
Singers from London